The Oregon State Beavers football statistical leaders are individual statistical leaders of the Oregon State Beavers football program in various categories, including passing, rushing, receiving, total offense, defensive stats, and kicking. Within those areas, the lists identify single-game, single-season, and career leaders. The Beavers represent Oregon State University in the NCAA's Pac-12 Conference.

Although Oregon State began competing in intercollegiate football in 1893, the school's official record book doesn't generally list statistics from before the 1950s, as records from before this year are often incomplete and inconsistent.

These lists are dominated by more recent players for several reasons:
 Since the 1950s, seasons have increased from 10 games to 11 and then 12 games in length.
 The NCAA didn't allow freshmen to play varsity football until 1972 (with the exception of the World War II years), allowing players to have four-year careers.
 Bowl games only began counting toward single-season and career statistics in 2002. The Beavers have played in 9 bowl games since this decision, allowing many recent players an extra game to accumulate statistics.

These lists are updated through the end of the 2020 season.

Passing

Passing yards

Passing touchdowns

Rushing

Rushing yards

Rushing touchdowns

Receiving

Receptions

Receiving yards

Receiving touchdowns

Total offense
Total offense is the sum of passing and rushing statistics. It does not include receiving or returns.

Total offense yards

Total touchdowns

Defense

Interceptions

Tackles

Sacks

Kicking

Field goals made

Field goal percentage

References

Oregon State